is a former Japanese volleyball player and occasional model. She is the tallest fashion model in Japan.

Nicknamed Megu, she was a member of the national volleyball team that won the bronze medal at the 2001 World Grand Champions Cup playing middle blocker for NEC Red Rockets. Wearing number 10 and 15, she stayed with the team until her retirement on August 30, 2005.

Biography
Born in Kitakyushu, Fukuoka, she studied at Higashi Kyushu Ryukoku high school (東九州龍谷高等学校) and was a member of the volleyball team there. When she was 11 years old, she was featured in a TV show as Japan's tallest primary schoolchild. She comes from a tall family, with both her father and her brother measuring 6'3". After finishing high school, she joined the volleyball team NEC Red Rockets. She was called up to the Japanese national team and played in the 2001 World Grand Champions Cup.

Because of her 193 cm height (6'4"), Kawamura was positioned as a middle blocker.

After retiring, Kawamura began her modeling career. In 2005, she participated in a selection pageant for the Japanese representative of Miss International 2006.

TV appearances
 ラジかる

Awards
 World Grand Champions Cup Bronze Medal (2001)
 The 11th Women's V.League New Face Award (2004–05)

References

External links
 20th year old Kimono Celebration
 NEC Sports retirement announcement

1983 births
Living people
Sportspeople from Kitakyushu
Japanese women's volleyball players
Japanese female models
Asian Games medalists in volleyball
Volleyball players at the 2002 Asian Games
Asian Games bronze medalists for Japan
Medalists at the 2002 Asian Games